Chah Mahki (also Romanized as Chāh Maḩkī and Chāh Mahkī) is a village in Hana Rural District, Abadeh Tashk District, Neyriz County, Fars Province, Iran. At the 2006 census, its population was 209, in 46 families.

References 

Populated places in Abadeh Tashk County